= Plutonium tetroxide =

Compound of plutonium and oxygen

Plutonium tetraoxide
Names
- Other names Plutonium(VIII) oxide

Identifiers
3D model (JSmol)	Interactive image
- InChI: InChI=1S/O2.2O.Pu/c1-2;;;/q-1;;;+1 Key: KOOAIBAKTCSZCC-UHFFFAOYSA-N
- SMILES: O=[Pu+]=O.O=[O-]

Properties
Chemical formula	PuO_{4}
Molar mass	308 g·mol^{−1}
Solubility in water	insoluble (hydrates)
- Except where otherwise noted, data are given for materials in their standard state (at 25 °C [77 °F], 100 kPa). Infobox references

Plutonium tetraoxide is an inorganic binary compound of plutonium and oxygen with the chemical formula PuO_{4}. This is an exotic, higher-order oxide of plutonium where the metal is in the rare +8 oxidation state. The compound is volatile and very hard to isolate.

Theoretical calculations show that the molecule has the structure (O=Pu=O)^{+}(O_{2})^{-}.
